The 1980–81 FIBA Korać Cup was the tenth edition of FIBA's Korać Cup basketball competition. The Spanish Joventut Freixenet defeated the Italian Carrera Venezia in the final on March 19, 1981 in Barcelona, Spain. This was the first edition of the competition to feature a champion team outside of Italy or Yugoslavia.

First round

|}

Second round

|}

Automatically qualified to round of 16
  Ferrarelle Rieti (title holder)
  Jugoplastika
  Dynamo Moscow
  Joventut Freixenet
  ASVEL

Round of 16

Semi finals

|}

Final
March 19, Palau Blaugrana, Barcelona

|}

External links
 1980–81 FIBA Korać Cup @ linguasport.com
1980–81 FIBA Korać Cup

1980–81
1980–81 in European basketball